Charles John Burnett is a Scottish antiquarian and former officer of arms.

Burnett was born in 1940 and educated at Gray's School of Art in Aberdeen, and the University of Edinburgh.

He has worked for a number of museums, including: Letchworth Museum, the National Museum of Antiquities of Scotland, the Scottish United Services Museum at Edinburgh Castle, and Duff House, Banff

Burnett was appointed Dingwall Pursuivant of Arms in Ordinary in 1983 and promoted to Ross Herald of Arms in Ordinary in 1988. He retired as an officer of arms in ordinary in 2010 and was appointed Ross Herald Extraordinary for a period of five years, demitting office on 31 December 2015. His 1992 M.Litt thesis at the University of Edinburgh was entitled The Officers of Arms and heraldic art under King James Sixth & First 1567-1625. He was also the president of the Heraldry Society of Scotland.

Arms

References

Living people
Scottish officers of arms
Scottish genealogists
1940 births
Alumni of Gray's School of Art